Heukelom is the name of several places in the Netherlands:

 Heukelom, North Brabant
 Heukelom, Limburg

See also: Heukelum